Perry Edward McCarthy (born 3 March 1961) is a British racing driver, who drove for the Andrea Moda team in Formula One in , though never making it into a race, before moving into sportscars, including driving in the 24 Hours of Le Mans five times between 1996 and 2003.

McCarthy also portrayed The Stig in the first two series of the revamped version of BBC motoring show Top Gear.

Career
Born in Stepney, East London, McCarthy grew up to work for his father's company servicing North Sea oil rigs. Unlike most Formula One drivers, McCarthy did not start racing in karts. He worked his way through the junior categories of motor sport in Europe, such as Formula Ford, Formula 3, eventually F3000 and various touring and sports car races in the US, including drives for Spice Engineering.

In 1991, McCarthy was chosen to test for the Footwork Formula One team. Although he impressed the team, his break did not come until the eve of the 1992 Formula One season, when he was signed by the independent Andrea Moda team run by Andrea Sassetti who thought that entering Formula One would be a good way to advertise his shoe business. The team was uncompetitive, disorganized and poorly managed, and after a lengthy battle to gain an FIA Super Licence the season soon descended into farce. Because Sassetti was unable to release McCarthy for Enrico Bertaggia, who had left the team before and attempted to return with the promise of extra funding, McCarthy received unfair treatment from the owner, being frequently denied more than a handful of laps in which to prepare, which led to his failure to qualify for any Grand Prix. His Grand Prix debut in Spain lasted eighteen metres down the pit lane in pre-qualifying before the engine failed. In the British Grand Prix, he was sent out with wet tyres on a dry track. For the Hungarian Grand Prix, he was only allowed to leave the pits 45 seconds before the end of the pre-qualifying session, which made it impossible for him to set a lap time even if he had a faster car. Finally, in the Belgian Grand Prix, Andrea Moda's final entry, McCarthy was sent out for the qualifying session with a broken steering part in his car, which has been extracted from teammate Roberto Moreno's car, which would have led to a violent crash at the Raidillon curve had McCarthy not managed to regain control of the car. He relived this dramatic story and discussed his brief stint around the F1 paddock during an appearance on award-winning motoring podcast Fuelling Around. The team folded before the end of the season in controversial circumstances and McCarthy was left without a drive. In a July 2004 interview with The Times, McCarthy discussed how this period in his career had contributed to his being dubbed the world's unluckiest racing driver, saying "Dick Dastardly had more luck than me".

McCarthy did not race in Formula One after 1992, but tested for both Williams and Benetton teams during the 1990s. He was denied a permanent role as test driver at Benetton because he was covering for their normal test driver, Alessandro Zanardi, who was unwell. He had little success at Williams because he did not see eye to eye with the engineers and the position was then given to David Coulthard.

Top Gear
After a brief retirement, McCarthy returned to sports car racing, appearing at Le Mans in 2002 and numerous other events. In 2002, he released his autobiography entitled Flat Out, Flat Broke, in which he spoke candidly about his time in Formula One and, in the second edition, his work for the BBC's Top Gear motoring show as The Stig, a masked, anonymous, racing driver who evaluated the latest high performance cars. McCarthy was the original, black-suited Stig, who left after the first two series. He provided commentary on F1 races for the BBC in 2009. McCarthy now works as a corporate ambassador and after-dinner speaker for corporations around the world.

Bibliography
In 2002, McCarthy wrote an autobiography, titled Flat Out, Flat Broke: Formula 1 the Hard Way!; it detailed his career, and the hardships he faced while trying to break into Formula One. In the second edition of this book, McCarthy revealed that he was Top Gears The Stig.

Racing record

Complete International Formula 3000 results
(key)

Complete Formula One results
(key)

Complete 24 Hours of Le Mans results

References

|-

English racing drivers
English Formula One drivers
1961 births
Living people
International Formula 3000 drivers
British Formula 3000 Championship drivers
Andrea Moda Formula One drivers
24 Hours of Le Mans drivers
American Le Mans Series drivers
World Sportscar Championship drivers
Sportspeople from Essex
Top Gear people
Porsche Carrera Cup GB drivers
Oreca drivers
DAMS drivers
Arena Motorsport drivers
David Price Racing drivers
Audi Sport drivers